Wendy Weir may refer to:

 Wendy Stites, Australian costume designer, sometimes credited Wendy Weir
 Wendy Weir (cricketer) (1948–2020), Australian cricket player